This article lists languages depending on their use of grammatical gender.

No grammatical gender
Certain language families, such as the Austronesian, Turkic and Uralic language families, usually have no grammatical genders (see genderless language). Many indigenous American languages (across language families) have no grammatical gender.

Austronesian

Bikol 
Carolinian
Chamoru
Cebuano
Filipino
Gilbertese
Ilokano
Javanese
Malagasy
Māori
Marshallese
Nauruan
Niuean
Palauan
Rapa Nui
Samoan
Sundanese
Tagalog
Tahitian
Tetum
Tongan
Tuvaluan
Visayan

Constructed

 Esperanto (Esperanto has three gendered pronouns, and separate endings to distinguish natural gender, although there is a movement for gender reform in Esperanto.)
 Ido
 Lingua Franca Nova
Lojban
Toki Pona
Creoles

 Haitian Creole
 Mauritian Creole
 Sango

Isolates
Ainu
Basque
Chimariko
Haida
Nivkh
Warao
Zuni
Indo-European
 Afrikaans (Afrikaans has three gendered pronouns, but no other grammatical gender, very similar to English.)
Armenian
Bengali 
Dhivehi 
English (English has three gendered pronouns, but no longer has grammatical gender in the sense of noun class distinctions.)
Konkani
Kurdish (Central and Southern Dialects only.)
Nepali (Has gendered pronouns but no grammatical genders.)
Odia
Ossetic
Persian
Niger-Congo

 Ewe
 Fula
 Igbo
 Yoruba

Turkic

Azerbaijani
Bashkir
Chuvash
Crimean Tatar
Gagauz
Karachay-Balkar
Karakalpak
Kazakh
Khakas
Khalaj
Kumyk
Kyrgyz
Nogai
Salar
Shor
Tatar
Turkish
Turkmen
Tuvinian
Uyghur
Uzbek
Yakut

Uralic

 Estonian
 Finnish
 Karelian
 Ingrian
 Veps
 Livonian
 Votic
 Mari
 Erzya
 Moksha
 Udmurt
 Komi
 Permyak
 Sámi languages
 Hungarian
 Khanty
 Mansi
Nenets
Uto-Aztecan

 Comanche
 Nahuatl
Pipil
 Shoshone
Yaqui

Other
Aleut (Eskimo-Aleut)
Carib (Cariban)
Canela (Macro-Jê)
Georgian (Kartvelian)
Greenlandic (Eskimo-Aleut)
Guarani (Tupian)
Japanese (Japonic)
Kannada (Dravidian; has three gendered pronouns, but no grammatical gender)
Karuk (Hokan)
Khmer (Austroasiatic)
Korean (Koreanic)
Lao (Kra-Dai)
Malayalam (Dravidian)
Manchu (Tungusic) used vowel harmony in gender inflections.
Malayalam (Dravidian; has three gendered pronouns, but no grammatical gender)
Mandarin (Sino-Tibetan)
Miwok (Yok-Utian)
Mongolian (Mongolic)
Murle (Nilo-Saharan)
Newari (different from Nepali) (Sino-Tibetan)
Nez Perce (Plateau Penutian)
Pomo (Hokan)
Rama (Chibchan)
Southern Quechua (Quechuan)
Tamil (Dravidian; has three gendered pronouns, but no grammatical gender)
Wichita (Caddoan)
Yurok (Algic)

Noun classifiers
Some languages without noun class may have noun classifiers instead. This is common in East Asian languages.

American Sign Language
Bengali (Indo-European)
Burmese
Modern written Chinese (Sino-Tibetan) has gendered pronouns introduced in the 1920s to accommodate the translation of Western literature (see Chinese pronouns), which do not appear in  spoken Chinese. Even in written language it doesn’t have grammatical gender in the sense of noun class distinctions.
Fijian (Austronesian)
Hawaiian (Austronesian) (There is a noun class system but it is flexible and determined by how the arguments in a statement interact with each other. Therefore, it doesn't constitute a grammatical gender. For example, a house is kino ʻō (o class) because you can go into it so "your house" would be "kou hale." However, if you build the house yourself, the possessive would take the kino ʻā form "kāu hale.")
Indonesian (Austronesian)
Japanese
Khmer
Hmong
Korean
Malay (Austronesian)
Persian (Indo-European)
Thai
Vietnamese

Masculine and feminine
Afro-Asiatic

Afar
Agaw
Akkadian
Ancient Egyptian
Amharic
Arabic 
Beja
Aramaic
Coptic
Hebrew
Maltese
Oromo
Saho
South Arabian
Somali
Tamazight (Berber)
Tuareg

Indo-European
Albanian - the neuter has almost disappeared.
Breton (Brythonic)
Catalan - although it has the pronoun "ho" which substitutes antecedents with no gender, like a subordinate clause or a neuter demonstrative ("això", "allò"). For example: "vol això" (he wants this)→"ho vol" (he wants it), or "ha promès que vindrà" (he has promised he will come)→"ho ha promès" (he has promised it).
Cornish (Brythonic)
Corsican
French
Friulan
Galician (with some remains of neuter in the demonstratives isto (this here), iso (this there/that here) and aquilo (that there), which can also be pronouns)
Hindi
Irish (Goidelic)
Italian - there is a trace of the neuter in some nouns and personal pronouns. E.g.: singular l'uovo, il dito; plural le uova, le dita ('the egg(s)', 'the finger(s)'), although singulars of the type dito and uovo and their agreements coincide in form with masculine grammatical gender and the plurals conform to feminine grammatical morphology.
Kashmiri
Kurdish (only Northern dialect and only in singular nouns and pronouns, not in plural and not in adjectives or verbs; Central or Southern dialects have lost grammatical gender altogether)
Ladin
Latvian
Lithuanian - there is a neuter gender for all declinable parts of speech (most adjectives, pronouns, numerals, participles), except for nouns, but it has a very limited set of forms.
Manx (Goidelic)
Occitan
Pashto - the neuter has almost disappeared.
Portuguese - there is a trace of the neuter in the demonstratives (isto/isso/aquilo) and some indefinite pronouns.
Punjabi (see also Punjabi dialects)
Romani
Sardinian
Scottish Gaelic (Goidelic)
Sicilian
Spanish - there is a neuter of sorts, though generally expressed only with the definite article lo, used with adjectives denoting abstract categories: lo bueno,  or when referring to an unknown object eso.
Urdu (Lashkari)
Venetian
Welsh (Brythonic)
Zazaki

Common and neuter
In these languages, animate nouns are predominantly of common gender, while inanimate nouns may be of either gender.
Danish (Danish has four gendered pronouns, but only two grammatical genders in the sense of noun classes. See Gender in Danish and Swedish.)
Dutch (The masculine and the feminine have merged into a common gender in standard Dutch, but a distinction is still made by some when using pronouns, and in Southern-Dutch varieties. See Gender in Dutch grammar.)
Filipino
 (West) Frisian
Hittite (The Hittite "common" gender contains nouns that are either masculine or feminine in other Indo-European languages, while the "neuter" gender continues the inherited Indo-European neuter gender.)
Norwegian (In the Bergen dialect, and in some sociolects of Oslo.)
Swedish (The distinction between masculine and feminine still exists for people and some animals. Some dialects retain all three genders for all nouns.) (Swedish has four gendered pronouns, but only two grammatical genders in the sense of noun classes. See Gender in Danish and Swedish.)

Animate and inanimate

Basque (the declension of the nominal phrase in the locative cases differs depending on the animacy of the referent; a different and unrelated masculine/feminine distinction is present in the verbal allocutive agreement)
Biak - One of the few Austronesian languages with grammatical gender. The distinction is only maintained in the plural, additionally making Biak a rare exception to Greenberg's linguistical universal 45.
Elamite
Georgian - different verbs are used in various cases (to put, to take, to have etc.), while referring to animate or inanimate objects.
Many Native American languages, including most languages of the Algic, Siouan and Uto-Aztecan language families, as well as isolates such as Mapudungun
Middle Korean
Sumerian
Chukotko-Kamchatkan

In many such languages, what is commonly termed "animacy" may in fact be more accurately described as a distinction between human and non-human, rational and irrational, "socially active" and "socially passive" etc.

Masculine, feminine, and neuter

Indo-European

Proto-Indo-European originally had two genders (animate and inanimate), and later the animate split into masculine and feminine, and the inanimate became neuter.
Asturian - Masculine, feminine and neuter for uncountable nouns.
Belarusian
Bulgarian *
Czech *
Dutch - the masculine and the feminine have merged into a common gender in standard Dutch, but a distinction is still made by many when using pronouns. In South-Dutch (Flemish) spoken language all articles, possessives and demonstratives differentiate between masculine and feminine: see gender in Dutch grammar.
Faroese
Gaulish
German
Greek - in the Attic dialect of Ancient Greek, neuter plurals are treated like singulars in verbal agreement.
Gujarati
Icelandic
Latin
Limburgish
Low German
Luxembourgish
Macedonian
Marathi
Norwegian - the three-gender system is widely used throughout the country, except in the Bergen dialect (some sociolects in Oslo lack it as well), where the dialect allows feminine nouns to be given the corresponding masculine inflections or do not use the feminine gender at all.
Old English
Old Irish
Old Persian
Old Prussian
Pennsylvania German
Polish *
Romanian - the neuter gender (called neutru or sometimes ambigen in Romanian) has no separate forms of its own; neuter nouns behave like masculine nouns in the singular, and feminine in the plural. This behavior is seen in the form of agreeing adjectives and replacing pronouns. See Romanian nouns.
Russian *
Sanskrit
Serbo-Croatian *
Slovak *
Slovene *
Sorbian
Swedish - as in Dutch, the masculine and the feminine have merged into a common gender in standard Swedish. But many dialects, mainly in Dalecarlia, Ostrobothnia (Finland) and northern Sweden, have preserved three genders in spoken language.
Ukrainian *
Yiddish

Note: in Slavic languages marked with an asterisk (*), traditionally only masculine, feminine and neuter genders are recognized, with animacy as a separate category for the masculine and feminine (in East Slavic languages) or masculine only (elsewhere); the actual situation is similar to Czech.

Other
Ket
Telugu

More than three grammatical genders

Burushaski: masculine, feminine, animals/countable nouns and inanimates/uncountable nouns/abstracts/fluids
Chechen: 6 classes (masculine, feminine and 4 other miscellaneous classes)
Czech, Slovak and Rusyn: Masculine animate, Masculine inanimate, Feminine, Neuter (traditionally, only masculine, feminine and neuter genders are recognized, with animacy as a separate category for the masculine).
Polish: Masculine personal, Masculine animate, Masculine inanimate, Feminine, Neuter (traditionally, only masculine, feminine and neuter genders are recognized).
Pama–Nyungan languages including Dyirbal and other Australian languages have gender systems such as: Masculine, feminine (see Women, Fire, and Dangerous Things), vegetable and neuter. (Some linguists do not regard the noun class system of this language as grammatical gender.)
Many Australian languages have a system of gender superclassing in which membership in one gender can mean membership in another.
Kannada: Originally had 9 gender pronouns but only 3 exist at present. 
Zande: Masculine, feminine, animate, and inanimate.
Bantu languages have many noun classes.
Rwanda-Rundi family of languages (including Kinyarnwanda, Kirundi, and Ha): 16 noun classes grouped in 10 pairs.
Ganda: ten classes called simply Class I to Class X and containing all sorts of arbitrary groupings but often characterised as people, long objects, animals, miscellaneous objects, large objects and liquids, small objects, languages, pejoratives, infinitives, mass nouns
Shona: 20 noun classes (singular and plural are considered separate classes)
Swahili: 18 noun classes (singular and plural are considered separate classes)
Tuyuca: Tuyuca has 50–140 noun classes.
Sepik languages: Sepik languages all distinguish between at least masculine and feminine genders, but some distinguish three or more genders.

References

Grammatical gender